Tomb of I'timād-ud-Daulah (I'timād-ud-Daulah Maqbara) is a Mughal mausoleum in the city of Agra in the Indian state of Uttar Pradesh. Often described as a "jewel box", sometimes called the "Bachcha Taj" or the "Baby Taj", the tomb of I'timād-ud-Daulah is often regarded as a draft of the Taj Mahal.

Along with the main building, the structure consists of numerous outbuildings and gardens. The tomb, built between 1622 and 1628, represents a transition between the first phase of monumental Mughal architecture – primarily built from red sandstone with marble decorations, as in Humayun's Tomb in Delhi and Akbar's tomb in Sikandra – to its second phase, based on white marble and pietra dura inlay, most elegantly realized in the Taj Mahal.

The mausoleum was commissioned by Nur Jahan, the wife of Jahangir, for her father Mirzā Ghiyās Beg, originally a Persian Amir in exile, who had been given the title of I'timād-ud-Daulah (pillar of the state). Mirzā Ghiyās Beg was also the grandfather of Mumtāz Mahāl (originally named Arjumand Banu Begum, daughter of Asaf Khan), the wife of the emperor Shah Jahan, responsible for the construction of the Taj Mahal.

Tomb

Located on the eastern bank of the Yamuna River, the mausoleum is set in a large cruciform garden criss-crossed by water courses and walkways. The mausoleum itself covers about twenty-three meters square, and is built on a base about fifty meters square and about one meter high. On each corner are octagonal towers, about thirteen meters tall.

The walls are made up from white marble from Rajasthan encrusted with semi-precious stone decorations: cornelian, jasper, lapis lazuli, onyx, and topaz formed into images of cypress trees and wine bottles, or more elaborate decorations like cut fruit or vases containing bouquets. Light penetrates to the interior through delicate jali screens of intricately carved white marble. The interior decoration is considered by many to have inspired that of the Taj Mahal, which was built by her stepson, Mughal ruler Shah Jahan.

Many of Nūr Jahān's relatives are interred in the mausoleum. The only asymmetrical element of the entire complex is that the cenotaphs of her father and mother have been set side-by-side, a formation replicated in the Taj Mahal.

History 
This is the tomb of Mirza Ghiyas Beg and his wife Asmat Beghum. He hailed from Iran and served Akbar. He was the father of the famous Nur-Jehan and grandfather of Mumtaz-Mahal of the Taj Mahal fame. He was made Vazir (Prime Minister) after Nur Jehan's marriage with Jehangir in 1611. He held the mansab of 7000/7000 and the title : "I'timad-Ud-Daulah" (The Lord treasurer). He died at Agra in 1622, a few months after his wife's death. Nur Jehan built this tomb for her parents between 1622 and 1628. Her own tomb and that of Jehangir are at Lahore.

The Tomb of I'timad-Ud-Daulah is a masterpiece of the domeless class of Mughal tombs. It is the first building finished in white marble and marks the transitional phase from red stone to white marble, from Akbar's tomb Sikandra to the Taj Mahal. It reflects the personality of the polished Iranian who lies buried here, and, more than that, the formal and ornamental character of its builder Nur Jehan who ruled the Mughal Empire from behind the curtain for 16 years (1611–27).

Architecture 

The tomb, situated on the eastern bank of the river Jamuna, is planned in the centre of a Char-Bagh (four-quartered garden), with the usual enclosing walls and side buildings. As conditioned by its situation, the main gate is on the eastern side. Ornamental gateways with prominent lawns are built in the middle of north and south sides. A multi-storeyed open pleasure pavilion is there on the western side, overlooking the river impressively. These buildings are of red sandstone with bold inlaid designs in white marble.

Shallow water channels, sunk in the middle of the raised stone paved pathways, with intermittent tanks and cascades, divided the garden into four equal quarters. They are only slightly raised from the parterres which could be converted into flower beds. Space for large plants and trees was reserved just adjoining the enclosing walls, leaving the mausoleum fully open to view.

The main tomb of white marble is marvellously set in the centre of the garden. It stands on a plinth of red stone having in the middle of each side, facing the central arch, a lotus tank with fountain. The tomb is square in plan with octagonal towers, surmounted by chhatris, attached to its corners. Each facade has three arches: the central one providing the entrance, and the other two on the sides being closed by jalis. Each side is protected by a chhajja and a jali balustrade above it. There is no dome; instead, the building is roofed by a square baradari having three arched openings on each side which are closed by jalis except in the middle of the north and south sides. It is protected by a chhajja above which is the chaukhandi (pyramidal) roof, crowned by lotus petals and kalash finials. The interior is composed of a central square hall housing the cenotaphs of Asmat Begum, Mirza Ghiyas, four oblong rooms on the sides and four square rooms on the corners, all interconnected by common doorways. The cenotaph of Asmat Begum occupies the exact centre of the hall. Corner rooms have tombstones of Nur Jehan's other relations.

The most important aspect of this tomb is its polychrome ornamentation. Beautiful floral, stylized, arabesque and geometrical designs have been depicted on the whole exterior in inlay and mosaic techniques, in various pleasing tints and tones. Wine vase, dish and cup, cypress, honeysuckle, guldasta (flower bouquet) and such other Iranian motifs, typical of the art of Jehangir, have been emphatically used. Some compositions have been inspired by the plant studies of Ustad Mansur Naqqash, the famous "fauna and flora" painter of Jehangir. Some stylized designs have also been done in exquisite carving, both incised and relief. They look like embroidery work done in ivory. Delicacy is their quality. Stucco and painting have been done in the interior where minute animal and human figures have also been shown. The inspiration has come from the contemporary art of painting. There is no glazed tiling and the decoration is largely by coloured stones which is an indigenous development. By far, it is the most gorgeously ornamented Mughal building. It testifies that "the Mughals began like Titans and finished like jewellers". Chapters 48 and 73 of the Quran have been carved on the 64 panels on the external sides of the ground floor. The date of writing A.H. 1037/1627 A.D. is mentioned in the last panel. Chapter 67 of the Quran is inscribed on the 12 internal panels of the upper pavilion. 

This is protected and conserved by the Archaeological Survey of India.

Gallery

References

External links

Pictures of Etimad-ud-Daulah's Tomb Pictures of Itmad-Ud-Daulah's Tomb from a backpackers trip around India

Mughal tombs
Tourist attractions in Agra
Mausoleums in Uttar Pradesh
Buildings and structures in Agra
Buildings and structures completed in 1628
Persian gardens in India
Sandstone buildings in India
1628 establishments in India